This Is the Life is a 1935 American comedy film directed by Marshall Neilan and written by Lamar Trotti and Arthur T. Horman. The film stars Jane Withers, John McGuire, Sally Blane, Sidney Toler, Gloria Roy and Gordon Westcott. The film was released on October 18, 1935, by 20th Century Fox.

Plot

Cast 
Jane Withers as Geraldine 'Jerry' Revier
John McGuire as Michael Grant
Sally Blane as Helen Davis
Sidney Toler as Professor Lafcadio F. Breckenridge
Gloria Roy as Diane Revier
Gordon Westcott as Ed Revier
Francis Ford as 'Sticky' Jones
Emma Dunn as Mrs. Davis

References

External links
 
 

1935 films
1930s English-language films
American comedy films
1935 comedy films
Fox Film films
20th Century Fox films
Films directed by Marshall Neilan
American black-and-white films
1930s American films